The M 51 MACI and M 52 MACI (Mine Antichar Indétectable) are French circular minimum metal anti-tank blast mines. The use a variety of fuzes, a M61 pressure/friction fuze, a "tentacle" fuze with four hoses that triggers the mine when two of the opposite tentacles are crushed, and a tilt rod fuze. The M51 and M52 are broadly similar with a thin fibreglass cases, the principal difference being the M52 is slightly larger than the M51.

Specifications

References
 Jane's Mines and Mine Clearance
 
 
 

Anti-tank mines
Land mines of France